Spruch can mean "saying". It can also refer to:

 Spruchdichtung, a genre of Middle High German sung verse excluding love songs
 Spruch (music) or dictum, vocal music with lyrics taken from sacred scripture.
 Zbigniew Spruch, Polish cyclist